Rosie Elizabeth Bentham (born 29 July 2001) is an English actress, who has appeared as Gabby Thomas in Emmerdale since January 2016.

Early and personal life
Bentham was born in 2001 to John and Marianne Bentham, who acted as her chaperones whilst filming. Her father John, who was chaplain of the University of Nottingham, died on 6 August 2019 from a pulmonary embolism. Bentham attended The Nottingham Emmanuel School.

Career
Bentham joined The Television Workshop in 2013, and worked on plays, such as Oklahoma, Fiddler on the Roof, Sound of Music and Annie. Bentham auditioned for Emmerdale when producers contacted The Television Workshop, and had four callbacks before being offered the part of Gabby Thomas. She made her debut appearance in January 2016.

Awards and nominations

References

External links
 

21st-century English actresses
2001 births
Actresses from Nottinghamshire
English soap opera actresses
English television actresses
English child actresses
Living people
People from Nottingham